Atom optics (or atomic optics) is the area of physics which deals with beams of cold, slowly moving neutral atoms, as a special case of a particle beam.
Like an optical beam, the atomic beam may exhibit diffraction and interference, and can be focused with a Fresnel zone plate or a concave atomic mirror.
Several scientific groups work in this field.

Until 2006, the resolution of imaging systems based on atomic beams was not better than that of an optical microscope,
mainly due to the poor performance of the focusing elements. Such elements use small numerical aperture;
usually, atomic mirrors use grazing incidence, and the reflectivity drops drastically with increase of the
grazing angle; for efficient normal reflection, atoms should be ultracold, and
dealing with such atoms usually involves magnetic, magneto-optical or optical traps.

Recent scientific publications about Atom Nano-Optics, evanescent field lenses
and ridged mirrors
show significant improvement since the beginning of the 21st century. In particular, an
atomic hologram can be realized.
An extensive review article "Optics and interferometry with atoms and molecules" appeared in July 2009.
More bibliography about Atom Optics can be found at the Resource Letter.

See also
 Atomic nanoscope
 Electron microscope
 Quantum reflection

References

Atomic and Optical Science Researchers at the University of Arizona: http://www.atomwave.org.
Pierre Meystre. Atom Optics 

Atomic, molecular, and optical physics